Francesco "Ciccio" Caputo (born 6 August 1987) is an Italian professional footballer who plays as a striker for Empoli, on loan from Sampdoria. He represents the Italy national team.

Club career
Caputo started his career in the Pugliesi amateur divisions, first with Toritto and then with Real Altamura, before joining Bari in the summer of 2008. With the club, Caputo won the Serie B title during the 2008–09 season, but he was excluded from Bari's Serie A plans the following season. In mid-2009, he was loaned to Salernitana, along with his teammates Giuseppe Statella and Gianluca Galasso. The following season he was loaned out to Siena. He returned to Bari in 2011, and remained at the club for four seasons.

In 2015, he joined Entella on loan with an option to buy; at the end of the season, he was signed outright by the club. He remained with Entella for two seasons, scoring 35 goals.

On 18 August 2017, Empoli signed Caputo on a four-year contract for €2.8 million plus bonuses. He helped Empoli win the Serie B title and achieve promotion to Serie A during the 2017–18 season, forming a prolific attacking partnership with Alfredo Donnarumma; together, the pair scored 49 goals, and Caputo finished as the top scorer in the league, with 26 goals, while Donnarumma finished as the second-highest scorer with 23.

On 13 July 2019, Caputo signed to Sassuolo.

On 31 August 2021, Caputo joined Sampdoria on loan with an obligation to buy.

On 2 January 2023, Caputo returned to former club Empoli on loan with an obligation to buy should his new club avoid relegation.

International career
Caputo was called up to the senior Italy squad for the UEFA Nations League matches against Bosnia and Herzegovina and Netherlands in September 2020. Caputo made his debut for the national team on 7 October 2020, in a 6–0 home win against Moldova in a friendly match, also scoring the second goal of the match.

Style of play
A technically gifted forward, with an eye for goal, Caputo mainly plays as a striker, although he is capable of playing anywhere along the front line. He is mainly known in the media for his pace, work-rate, movement off the ball, and his powerful and accurate striking ability.

Career statistics

Club

International

Scores and results list Italy's goal tally first, score column indicates score after each Caputo goal.

Honours
Bari
Serie B: 2008–09

Empoli
Serie B: 2017–18

Individual
Serie B top scorer: 2017–18

References

External links

 
 

1987 births
Living people
People from Altamura
Footballers from Apulia
Association football forwards
Italian footballers
Italy international footballers
A.S. Noicattaro Calcio players
S.S.C. Bari players
U.S. Salernitana 1919 players
A.C.N. Siena 1904 players
Virtus Entella players
Empoli F.C. players
U.S. Sassuolo Calcio players
U.C. Sampdoria players
Serie A players
Serie B players
Sportspeople from the Metropolitan City of Bari